GAVE may refer to:

 Gave (Melgaço), a parish in Portugal
 Gave (placename element), a French word meaning torrential river in the west Pyrenees
 Gastric antral vascular ectasia (GAVE), a medical condition
 Gabinete de Avaliação Educacional (GAVE), an institution responsible for monitoring education in Portugal

See also
 Give (disambiguation)
 Given (disambiguation)
 Giving (disambiguation)
 The Giver, a novel by Lois Lowry